Muhammad Kamran Khan Mulakhail (born 19 January 1968) has been Justice of Balochistan High Court since 30 August 2013.

References

1968 births
Living people
Judges of the Balochistan High Court
Pakistani judges